The following is a list of notable events and releases of the year 1922 in Norwegian music.

Events

Deaths

 February
 22 – Thorvald Lammers, baritone singer, choral conductor, composer, and biographer (born 1841).

 October
 26 – Theodora Cormontan, pianist, music publisher, and composer (born 1840).

Births

 January
 4 – Arvid Gram Paulsen, jazz saxophonist, trumpeter, and composer  (died 1963).
 6 – Finn Mortensen, composer, music critic, and music teacher (died 1983).

 February
 18 – Antonio Bibalo, pianist and composer  (died 2008).

 June
 10 – Edvard Hagerup Bull, composer (died 2012).
 30 – Hanna-Marie Weydahl, pianist (died 2016).

See also
 1922 in Norway
 Music of Norway

References

 
Norwegian music
Norwegian
Music
1920s in Norwegian music